The Finders were an intentional community and a cult founded in Washington, D.C. in the early 1970s by former Air Force master sergeant AKA (Master of Games) Marion Pettie (1920-2004). The movement loosely based its teachings on, among others, the writings of the philosopher Lao Tzu. In the spirit of Mohandas Gandhi and Martin Luther King, they believed in complete passivity when faced with assertive official authority.

1987 arrest case

It came to wider public attention when two members of the movement were arrested in Tallahassee, Florida, in 1987 and charged with misdemeanor child abuse of the six children accompanying them, the two men having responded with silence when, in a public park, the police inquired as to their identity and relationship to the children. The men were Douglas Ammerman and James Michael Holwell, both described as "well-dressed men in suits." They used a van to transport "six scruffy, hungry children" of varying ages. The age range of the children was between age 2 and 11.

The two oldest children, referred to as "Mary" and "Max", were interviewed by law enforcement as the others were too young to properly communicate. It was noted that medical examinations of the children showed signs of sexual abuse and malnourishment as well as bite marks potentially belonging to an adult human. During the interview as well as eyewitness testimony from neighbors, it was discovered that the children were raised on a farm belonging to Pettie with little adult supervision, with there being twenty adults and one other child present. The younger children were observed to display behavior indicating they were not used to being in a house or using indoor plumbing, requesting to go outside to use the bathroom, or urinating in their pants (noted to lack underwear). "Max" had a poor concept of time. They explained that they were being “weaned” from their mothers and were rarely allowed inside the house, even sleeping outside. Neighbors observed that the children apparently lived in the farm’s watermelon field. Mary described Ammerman and Holwell as their "teachers", teaching them to read and "play games". One game involved disrobing a man, wearing his clothes, and going through his pockets for money (later revising her statement and asserting that only jackets were involved). The two reported seeing female members of the cult naked and believed this to be another game as well. When questioned about "bad touches" Mary denied sexual abuse but "became very fidgety and wanted to end the interview". At another Finders farm in Virginia, agents recorded cages on the premises with witnesses asserting they were used to keep children. The full medical and psychological reports are not available for public viewing as of 2022.

According to U.S. District Court records in Washington, a confidential police source had previously told authorities that the Finders were "a cult" that conducted "brainwashing" techniques at a warehouse and a Glover Park duplex raided by law enforcement. This source told of being recruited by the Finders with promises of "financial reward and sexual gratification" and of being invited by one member to "explore" satanism with them, according to the documents. Police sources said some of the items seized showed pictures of children engaged in what appeared to be "cult rituals." Officials of the U.S. Customs Service said that the material seized included photos showing children involved in bloodletting ceremonies of animals and one photograph of a child in chains. It was noted by a detective during the investigation that documents were discovered with detailed instructions for obtaining children for unspecified purposes (including the impregnation of female members of the community, purchasing, trading, and kidnapping), but neither the documents nor anyone else with knowledge of them could later be found.

Robert Gardner Terrell, who owned one of the raided properties, claimed ″We are rational people″, ″not devil worshipers or child molesters″, and ″anything we’ve done is based on the desire for the children to have the richest life they could have.″ According to Terrell the recovered photos of naked children were of Holwell’s own children, and the dead goats shown in the photos mentioned by the Customs Service were already butchered with the children being taught how to prepare them. The men were released six weeks later, with the state of Florida dropping all charges against them. Federal authorities concluded that there was no evidence of criminal activity, with it being noted that although more could have been done for the children, it was difficult to compile accurate information with what knowledge they did have into their lifestyle only being able to be judged subjectively. The authorities contacted the mothers of the children, who came to Tallahassee and retrieved them.

Allegations against the Cult
The Cult was led by a man and air force veteran Marion Petite aka (The Game Caller).
Despite this resolution, the issue was brought to wider attention as Skip Clements, a private detective and resident of Stuart, Florida, alleged with evidence that the Central Intelligence Agency had compelled the U.S. Customs Service to cease the investigation, supposedly because the commune was used as a front to train agents. Clements' substantiated allegations drew the interest of two United States Congress members and an investigation by the Department of Justice. The issue gained wider attention in 1993 when a 1987 "report" was made public, which stated without evidence that the DC Police Department investigation into The Finders had been dropped as a "a CIA internal matter." CIA spokesman David Christian asserted that the charges were a misunderstanding stemming from a company by the name of Future Enterprises Inc. being used to train agents, with one member of the Finders working as a part-time accountant there. Despite a lack of evidence or verification by the Washington, DC Police Department, the belief that this "report" indicated a larger conspiracy of child abuse became popular in some quarters, with Vice Magazine assessing in 2019 that "The Finders become a sort of Patient Zero" for the larger network of beliefs in government-linked child abuse such as "Jeffrey Epstein’s so-called suicide" and noting that the documentation itself revealed no known CIA interference in Florida when the child-abuse investigation would have been taking place.

In 2019, the FBI released hundreds of documents related to The Finders, noting on their FBI Vault website it was their top requested topic.

References

External links
 The Finders, FBI.Vault.gov

1970s establishments in Washington, D.C.
1987 in Florida
1993 controversies in the United States
Intentional communities in the United States
Conspiracy theories in the United States
False allegations of sex crimes
Lifestyles
Organizations based in Washington, D.C.
Organizations established in the 1970s
Satanic ritual abuse hysteria in the United States
Cults